Maharaja Jivajirao Scindia KStJ (26 June 1916 – 16 July 1961) was an Indian prince and government official.  

In the British Raj, he was the ruling Maharaja of the princely state of Gwalior in central India from 1925 until 1947.  After the state was absorbed into independent India, he was granted a privy purse, certain privileges, and the use of the title Maharaja of Gwalior by the Government of India, which he retained until his death in 1961.  He also served as the rajpramukh (governor) of the state of Madhya Bharat until 1956.

Early life

Jivajirao was a scion of the Scindia family, descended from the Maratha general Ranojirao Scindia. Ranojirao was the head of the Maratha armies in Malwa during the first part of the 18th century, as the Maratha Empire was expanding rapidly at the expense of the Mughal Empire. Daulatrao Scindia shifted the capital from Ujjain to the new city of Lashkar, near the historic fortress-city of Gwalior. The Scindias accepted British suzerainty in 1818 at the conclusion of their benefits from them after they lost the 3rd War Third Anglo-Maratha War. At 68,291 km², Gwalior was the largest state in the Central India Agency, and among the five largest princely states in all of India.

Personal life
Jivajirao became Maharaja on 5 June 1925, succeeding his father Madho Rao Scindia upon his death. On 21 February 1941, he married Lekha Divyeshwari Devi, afterwards known as Vijaya Raje Scindia, who was descended from the powerful Rana dynasty of Nepal. They were the parents of five children, four daughters and a son, including:
 Padma Raje, was married to HH Maharaja Kirit Bikram Manikya Debbarman of Tripura. Died in Calcutta, circa 1965.
 Usha Raje, is married to Nepalese Minister Pashupati Shamsher Jang Bahadur Rana of the Rana Dynasty, who is the grandson of Shree Teen Maharaja Mohan Shamsher Jang Bahadur Rana.
 Madhavrao Scindia (10 March 1945 – 30 September 2001), the former union cabinet minister in India, Member of Parliament and King of Gwalior.
 Vasundhara Raje, Former chief minister of the Indian state of Rajasthan.
 Yashodhara Raje, Bharatiya Janata Party (BJP) leader and MLA of the Indian state of Madhya Pradesh.

Career

Jivajirao ruled Gwalior state as an absolute monarch and a British vassal until shortly after India's independence on 15 August 1947. The rulers of Indian princely states were required to accede to either of the two dominions (India and Pakistan) created by the India Independence Act 1947. Jivajirao signed a covenant with the rulers of the adjoining princely states that united their several states to form a new state within the Union of India known as Madhya Bharat. This new covenanted state was to be governed by a council headed by a ruler to be known as the Rajpramukh. Madhya Bharat signed a fresh Instrument of Accession with the Government of India effective 15 June 1948. Jivajirao Scindia became the first rajpramukh, or appointed governor, of the state on 28 May 1948. He served as Rajpramukh until 31 October 1956, when the state was merged into Madhya Pradesh.

Family
After his death in 1961, Jivajirao's family remained involved in politics. In 1962, his widow, Rajmata Vijayraje Scindia, was elected to the Lok Sabha, beginning the family's career in electoral politics. She was initially a member of the Indian National Congress party, parted ways in 1967, joined the Jana Sangh, and later became an influential member of the Bharatiya Janata Party. Their son, Madhavrao Scindia, was elected to the Lok Sabha in 1971, representing the Jana Sangh. He later joined the Congress in 1980 served until his death in 2001. Madhavrao's son, Jyotiraditya Scindia, was also a member of the Congress Party, was elected in 2002 to the seat formerly held by his father. On 10-March-2020 Jyotiraditya Scindia quit Indian National Congress and was elected to the Rajya Sabha in June 2020 as BJP member. Jivajirao's daughter Vasundhara Raje is an eminent politician associated with the Bharatiya Janata Party. She was the first woman Chief Minister of Rajasthan and also was a member of the Lok Sabha for five consecutive terms since 1989. Vasundhara Raje's son, Dushyant Singh of Dholpur is a BJP MP. His youngest daughter, Yashodhara Raje has served as a State Minister in the Madhya Pradesh government.

Full name and titles
Jivajirao was also known with his full name: Lieutenant-General His Highness Ali Jah, Umdat ul-Umara, Hisam us-Sultanat, Mukhtar ul-Mulk, Azim ul-Iqtidar, Rafi-us-Shan Wala Shikoh, Muhtasham-i-Dauran, Maharajadhiraj Maharaja Shrimant Jivaji Rao Scindia Bahadur, Shrinath, Mansur-i-Zaman, Fidvi-i-Hazrat-i-Malika-i-Mua'zzama-i-Rafi-ud-Darja-i-Inglistan, Maharaja Scindia of Gwalior, GCSI, GCIE.

During his life he acquired several titles and honorific names:

1916 – 1925: Yuvaraja Maharaj Shrimant Jivaji Rao Scindia Bahadur
1925 – 1937: His Highness Ali Jah, Umdat ul-Umara, Hisam us-Sultanat, Mukhtar ul-Mulk, Azim ul-Iqtidar, Rafi-us-Shan Wala Shikoh, Muhtasham-i-Dauran, Maharajadhiraj Maharaja Shrimant Jivaji Rao Scindia Bahadur, Shrinath, Mansur-i-Zaman, Fidvi-i-Hazrat-i-Malika-i-Mua'zzama-i-Rafi-ud-Darja-i-Inglistan, Maharaja Scindia of Gwalior
1937 – 1941: His Highness Ali Jah, Umdat ul-Umara, Hisam us-Sultanat, Mukhtar ul-Mulk, Azim ul-Iqtidar, Rafi-us-Shan Wala Shikoh, Muhtasham-i-Dauran, Maharajadhiraj Maharaja Shrimant Jivaji Rao Scindia Bahadur, Shrinath, Mansur-i-Zaman, Fidvi-i-Hazrat-i-Malika-i-Mua'zzama-i-Rafi-ud-Darja-i-Inglistan, Maharaja Scindia of Gwalior, KStJ
1941 – 1943: Captain His Highness Ali Jah, Umdat ul-Umara, Hisam us-Sultanat, Mukhtar ul-Mulk, Azim ul-Iqtidar, Rafi-us-Shan Wala Shikoh, Muhtasham-i-Dauran, Maharajadhiraj Maharaja Shrimant Sir Jivaji Rao Scindia Bahadur, Shrinath, Mansur-i-Zaman, Fidvi-i-Hazrat-i-Malika-i-Mua'zzama-i-Rafi-ud-Darja-i-Inglistan, Maharaja Scindia of Gwalior, GCIE, KStJ
1943 – 1945: Major His Highness Ali Jah, Umdat ul-Umara, Hisam us-Sultanat, Mukhtar ul-Mulk, Azim ul-Iqtidar, Rafi-us-Shan Wala Shikoh, Muhtasham-i-Dauran, Maharajadhiraj Maharaja Shrimant Sir Jivaji Rao Scindia Bahadur, Shrinath, Mansur-i-Zaman, Fidvi-i-Hazrat-i-Malika-i-Mua'zzama-i-Rafi-ud-Darja-i-Inglistan, Maharaja Scindia of Gwalior, GCIE, KStJ
1945 – 1946: Major-General His Highness Ali Jah, Umdat ul-Umara, Hisam us-Sultanat, Mukhtar ul-Mulk, Azim ul-Iqtidar, Rafi-us-Shan Wala Shikoh, Muhtasham-i-Dauran, Maharajadhiraj Maharaja Shrimant Sir Jivaji Rao Scindia Bahadur, Shrinath, Mansur-i-Zaman, Fidvi-i-Hazrat-i-Malika-i-Mua'zzama-i-Rafi-ud-Darja-i-Inglistan, Maharaja Scindia of Gwalior, GCIE, KStJ
1946 – 1961: Lieutenant-General His Highness Ali Jah, Umdat ul-Umara, Hisam us-Sultanat, Mukhtar ul-Mulk, Azim ul-Iqtidar, Rafi-us-Shan Wala Shikoh, Muhtasham-i-Dauran, Maharajadhiraj Maharaja Shrimant Sir Jivaji Rao Scindia Bahadur, Shrinath, Mansur-i-Zaman, Fidvi-i-Hazrat-i-Malika-i-Mua'zzama-i-Rafi-ud-Darja-i-Inglistan, Maharaja Scindia of Gwalior, GCSI, GCIE, KStJ

Honours

(ribbon bar, as it would look today)

King George V Silver Jubilee Medal, 1935
King George VI Coronation Medal, 1937
Knight of the Order of St John (KStJ), 1937
Knight Grand Commander of the Order of the Indian Empire (GCIE), 1941
1939-1945 Star, 1945
British War Medal, 1945
India Service Medal, 1945
Knight Grand Commander of the Order of the Star of India (GCSI), 1946
Indian Independence Medal, 1947
Queen Elizabeth II Coronation Medal, 1953

References
 
 
 

1916 births
1961 deaths
Jiyajirao
Knights Grand Commander of the Order of the Indian Empire
Knights Grand Commander of the Order of the Star of India
Knights of the Order of St John
Indian knights
Rajpramukhs
Madhya Bharat politicians